Ashok Manda Bishnoi better known by his stage name Rapperiya Baalam is a Jaipur, Rajasthan-based rapper, songwriter, music composer and producer. He rose to fame in 2014 with his song "Mharo Rajasthan", a folk hip hop fusion song which  featuring Swaroop Khan. His other hits are "Hariyala Banna", "Jaipur Anthem", "Des Padharo Sa" and "Dil Mere". He, along with lyrics writer Kunaal Vermaa has worked with bollywood playback singer Ravindra Upadhyay for song "Des Padharo Sa",and with musician Mohit Gaur for song "Phir Dil Se Pukaar Tu". Better known for his experiments in Rajasthani folk music Rapperiya Baalam and his team came up with Hariyala Banna in 2016. Hariyala Banna sung by Bollywood playback singer Ravindra Upadhyay and Kamal Choudhary.

Biography 
He was born on 4 February 1992 at Dabla, tehsil Raisinghnagar, district Sriganganagar, Rajasthan to a Zamindar Bishnoi family. His birth name is Ashok Manda, after completing primary school in Raisinghnagar tehsil, he moved to Jaipur in 2006 for secondary and college education, he started learning keyboard and piano under the guidance of Pradeep Chaturvedi in 2012, who is one of the representative at Trinity College London and Jaipur based piano teacher. Latest Rapperiya goes to India's Got Talent Season-8 with Ravindra Upadhyay, Sumer Dangi and Saurabh Parihar as Swagsthaan Group.

Albums

References

External links 
 Rapperiya Baalam  at Times of India
 Rapperiya Baalam at Dainik Bhaskar

Indian male singer-songwriters
Indian singer-songwriters
Living people
Year of birth missing (living people)